This article documents notable spaceflight events during the year 2018. For the first time since 1990, more than 100 orbital launches were performed globally.

Overview

Planetary exploration 
The NASA InSight seismology probe was launched in May 2018 and landed on Mars in November. The Parker Solar Probe was launched to explore the Sun in August 2018, and reached its first perihelion in November, traveling faster than any prior spacecraft. On 20 October the ESA and JAXA launched BepiColombo to Mercury, on a 10-year mission featuring several flybys and eventually deploying two orbiters in 2025 for local study. The asteroid sampling mission Hayabusa2 reached its target Ryugu in June, and the similar OSIRIS-REx probe reached Bennu in December. China launched its Chang'e 4 lander/rover in December which performed the first ever soft landing on the far side of the Moon in January 2019; a communications relay was sent to the second Earth-Moon Lagrange point in May. The Google Lunar X Prize expired on 31 March without a winner for its $20 million grand prize, because none of its five finalist teams were able to launch a commercial lunar lander mission before the deadline.

Human spaceflight 
The Soyuz MS-10 October mission to the International Space Station (ISS) was aborted shortly after launch, due to a separation failure of one of the rocket's side boosters. The crew landed safely, and was rescheduled for March 2019 on Soyuz MS-12. The United States returned to spaceflight on 13 December with the successful suborbital spaceflight of VSS Unity Flight VP-03. The flight did not reach the Kármán line (100 km) but it did cross the US definition of space (50 mi). As per United States convention, it was the first human spaceflight launched from the U.S. since the last Space shuttle flight STS-135 in 2011. Astronauts Mark P. Stucky and Frederick W. Sturckow both received their FAA Commercial Astronaut Wings on 7 February 2019. The return of the United States to human orbital spaceflight was further delayed to 2019, as Boeing and SpaceX, under NASA supervision, performed further tests on their commercial crew spacecraft under development: Starliner on Atlas V and SpaceX Dragon 2 on Falcon 9.

Rocket innovation 
After a failed launch in 2017, the Electron rocket reached orbit with its second flight in January; manufactured by Rocket Lab, it is the first orbital rocket equipped with electric pump-fed engines.
On 3 February, the Japanese SS-520-5 rocket (a modified sounding rocket) successfully delivered a 3U CubeSat to orbit, thus becoming the lightest and smallest orbital launch vehicle ever.
On 6 February, SpaceX performed the much-delayed test flight of Falcon Heavy, carrying a car and a mannequin to a heliocentric orbit beyond Mars. Falcon Heavy is the most powerful rocket currently operational.
On 27 October, LandSpace launched Zhuque-1, the first privately developed rocket in China; it failed to reach orbit.
On 13 December Virgin Galactic's SpaceShipTwo reached 82.7 km, below the internationally recognized Kármán line but above the 50-mile definition of space used by the U.S. Federal Aviation Administration.

Accelerating activity 
The global activity of the launch industry grew significantly in 2018. 114 launches were conducted over the full year, compared with 91 in 2017, a 25% increase. Only three missions failed fully or partially in 2018, compared with eight failures in 2017. In August, China surpassed its previous record of 22 launches in 2016, and ended the year with a total 39 launches, also more launches than any other country in 2018. The 100th orbital launch of the year occurred on 3 December, exceeding all yearly tallies since the end of the Cold War space race in 1991.

Orbital launches 

|colspan=8 style="background:white;"|

January 
|-

|colspan=8 style="background:white;"|

February 
|-

|colspan=8 style="background:white;"|

March 
|-

|colspan=8 style="background:white;"|

April 
|-

|colspan=8 style="background:white;"|

May 
|-

|colspan=8 style="background:white;"|

June 
|-

|colspan=8 style="background:white;"|

July 
|-

|colspan=8 style="background:white;"|

August 
|-

|colspan=8 style="background:white;"|

September 
|-

|colspan=8 style="background:white;"|

October 
|-

|colspan=8 style="background:white;"|

November 
|-

|colspan=8 style="background:white;"|

December 
|-

|}

Suborbital flights 

|}

Deep-space rendezvous

Extravehicular activities (EVAs)

Space debris events

Orbital launch statistics

By country 
For the purposes of this section, the yearly tally of orbital launches by country assigns each flight to the country of origin of the rocket, not to the launch services provider or the spaceport. As examples, Soyuz launches by Arianespace in Kourou are counted under Russia because Soyuz-2 is a Russian rocket and Electron launches from Mahia in New Zealand count as USA launches.

By rocket

By family

By type

By configuration

By spaceport

By orbit

References 
Notes

Citations

External links 

 
Spaceflight by year
2018-related lists
Spaceflight
Transport timelines by year